Herogasm is a six-issue comic book limited series by Garth Ennis, John McCrea and Keith Burns. Originally published as a spin-off of The Boys, set between issues #30 and #31, Herogasm was collected in trade paperback in November 2009 as the fifth volume of The Boys, as The Boys: Herogasm. 

Herogasm was adapted as the sixth episode of the third season of the Amazon Prime Video streaming television adaptation of The Boys, with Jensen Ackles portraying Soldier Boy, a character introduced in Herogasm.

Publication history
In February 2009, Dynamite announced the first spin-off mini-series of The Boys in Herogasm, with art from John McCrea, who The Boys creator Garth Ennis had worked with numerous times before, and Keith Burns, a friend of McCrea's of whom he has said: "Keith's strengths are my weaknesses and vice versa." The series is The Boys version of the big 'event' storylines but, according to Ennis "while we're having a pop at the notion of mass crossovers within a shared universe, we're not picking on 'Crisis' or 'Secret Wars' or 'Countdown' or whatever in particular." The idea for the mini-series came about because the first part of the story does not involve the team and focuses on the superheroes, but will affect the main series:

Plot

The comic centers on the Boys as they infiltrate "Herogasm", an annual party for Vought-sponsored superheroes to allow them vacations.

Collected editions
The series has been collected into a trade paperback:

Herogasm (collected issues #1–6, 144 pages, Dynamite Entertainment, November 2009)

Adaptation
In January 2021, Eric Kripke, the showrunner of the Amazon Prime Video streaming television adaptation of The Boys, confirmed that Herogasm would be adapted as the sixth episode of the series' third season, featuring Jensen Ackles portraying Soldier Boy, a character introduced in Herogasm. Unlike the source material, in which Soldier Boy is depicted as a superhero who has yearly sex with Homelander in an attempt to gain membership in The Seven, Soldier Boy was depicted as the "Homelander before Homelander", a superhero from World War II brought out of retirement. In addition, the "Herogasm" event was held by Soldier Boy's teammates the TNT Twins at their house.

Reception
Herogasm opened to largely positive reviews by critics. In 2017, CBR ranked Herogasm as the comic book showing the fourth-most nudity in the 2000s, praising its depiction of "bedroom proclivities that rival their inhuman abilities." Will Morgan of The Slings & Arrows praised the "overall tone [a]s gleeful, as Ennis strives for ever more depraved and ludicrous situations for the series’ colour-splashed supporting cast to get into, taking irreverent jabs at the Avengers, the Fantastic Four, several of Batman's Rogue's Gallery, and scores more. Artist John McCrea's talent for amiable goonery has seldom been deployed to better effect; even the most horrible and heinous acts are presented with a chirpy patina which offsets the darker scenes masterfully." Screen Rant lauded the miniseries' "controversial" aspects, describing it as "a shocking storyline, even by the standards of The Boys monthly comic" but praising the decision to address "the idea of men being sexually assaulted", specifically a scene in which Hughie Campbell is assaulted by Black Noir.

References

The Boys (comics)
Comic book limited series
2009 comics debuts
2009 comics endings